A hereditary monarchy is the most common style of monarchy and is the form that is used by almost all of the world's existing monarchies.

Under a hereditary monarchy, all the monarchs come from the same family, and the crown is passed down from one member to another member of the family. The hereditary system has the advantages of stability, continuity and predictability, as well as the internal stabilizing factors of family affection and loyalty.

The following list is a list of hereditary monarchies and their current monarchs.

NOTE: The table comprises some sovereign monarchs of the world today, but is incomplete.

Monarchies of sovereign states

Africa
 Kingdom of Eswatini – Mswati III
 Kingdom of Lesotho – Letsie III
 Kingdom of Morocco – Mohammed VI

Americas
 Antigua and Barbuda – Charles III
 The Bahamas – Charles III
 Belize – Charles III
 Canada - Charles III
 Grenada – Charles III
 Jamaica – Charles III
 Saint Kitts and Nevis – Charles III
 Saint Lucia – Charles III
 Saint Vincent and the Grenadines – Charles III

Asia
 Kingdom of Bhutan – Jigme Khesar Namgyal Wangchuk
 Sultanate of Brunei – Hassanal Bolkiah
 Kingdom of Cambodia – Norodom Sihamoni
 Japan - Naruhito
 Kingdom of Thailand – Maha Vajiralongkorn

Europe
 Kingdom of Belgium – Philippe
 Kingdom of Denmark – Margrethe II
 Principality of Liechtenstein – Hans-Adam II
 Grand Duchy of Luxembourg – Henri
 Principality of Monaco – Albert II
 Kingdom of the Netherlands – Willem-Alexander
 Kingdom of Norway – Harald V
 Kingdom of Spain – Felipe VI
 Kingdom of Sweden – Carl XVI
 United Kingdom of Great Britain and Northern Ireland – Charles III

West Asia
 Kingdom of Bahrain – Hamad ibn Isa Al Khalifah
 Kingdom of Jordan – Abdullah II of Jordan
 State of Kuwait – Nawaf Al-Ahmad Al-Jaber Al-Sabah
 Sultanate of Oman – Haitham bin Tariq Al Said
 State of Qatar – Tamim bin Hamad Al Thani
 Kingdom of Saudi Arabia – Salman bin Abdulaziz Al Saud
 United Arab Emirates – Mohamed bin Zayed Al Nahyan, President of the UAE, Emir of Abu Dhabi

Oceania
 Commonwealth of Australia – Charles III
 Realm of New Zealand – Charles III
 Papua New Guinea – Charles III
 Solomon Islands – Charles III
 Kingdom of Tonga – Tupou VI
 Tuvalu – Charles III

Sub-national monarchies

Africa

Côte d'Ivoire
King of the Agni Sanwi – Okatamaisu Nana Amon N'duffu V

Ghana
 King of the Ashanti – Otumfuo Nana Osei Tutu II

Nigeria
Kingdom of Benin – Ewuare II
Kingdom of Ile-Ife – Adeyeye Enitan Ogunwusi
 Kano Emirate – Muhammadu Sanusi II
Kingdom of Onitsha – Nnaemeka Alfred Ugochukwu Achebe
Kingdom of Oyo – Lamidi Adeyemi III
 Sultanate of Sokoto – Sa'adu Abubakar

South Africa
King of the Zulus – Misuzulu Zulu

Uganda
 Kingdom of Buganda – Muwenda Mutebi II, Kabaka of Buganda
 Kingdom of Bunyoro – Solomon Iguru I, Omukama of Bunyoro
 Kingdom of Busoga – William Kadhumbula Gabula Nadiope IV, Kyabazinga of Busoga
 Kingdom of Rwenzururu – Irema-Ngoma I, Omusinga of Rwenzururu
 Kingdom of Toro – Rukidi IV, Omukama of Toro

Asia

Indonesia
 Sunanate of Surakarta – Susuhunan Pakubuwono XIII
 Sultanate of Yogyakarta – Hamengkubuwono X of Yogyakarta

Malaysia
 Sultanate of Johor – Ibrahim Ismail of Johor
 Sultanate of Kedah – Sallehuddin of Kedah
 Sultanate of Kelantan – Muhammad V of Kelantan
 Sultanate of Pahang – Abdullah of Pahang
 Sultanate of Perak – Nazrin Shah of Perak
 Kingdom of Perlis – Sirajuddin of Perlis
 Sultanate of Selangor – Sharafuddin of Selangor
 Sultanate of Terengganu – Mizan Zainal Abidin of Terengganu

United Arab Emirates
 Emirate of Abu Dhabi – His Highness Sheikh Khalifa bin Zayed Al Nahyan, Emir of Abu Dhabi
 Emirate of Ajman – His Highness Sheikh Humaid bin Rashid Al Nuaimi, Emir of Ajman
 Emirate of Dubai – His Highness Sheikh Mohammed bin Rashid Al Maktoum, Emir of Dubai
 Emirate of Fujairah – His Highness Sheikh Hamad bin Mohammed Al Sharqi, Emir of Fujairah
 Emirate of Ras al-Khaimah – His Highness Sheikh Saud bin Saqr al Qasimi, Emir of Ras al-Khaimah
 Emirate of Sharjah – His Highness Sheikh Sultan bin Muhammad Al-Qasimi, Emir of Sharjah
 Emirate of Umm al-Quwain – His Highness Sheikh Saud bin Rashid Al Mu'alla

See also
 Commonwealth realm
 List of monarchies
 List of dynasties

Lists of monarchies